Eudalaca stictigrapha is a species of moth of the family Hepialidae. It is known from Zimbabwe.

Taxonomy
Some sources list it as a synonym of Eudalaca semicana.

References

External links
Hepialidae genera

Moths described in 1910
Hepialidae